I Am Kloot is the self-titled second album by English rock band I Am Kloot. Released in 2003, the album reached #68 on the UK Albums Chart and yielded four singles and one download-only single. The download-only single "Proof" had a music video created for it by Krishna Stott, featuring actor Christopher Eccleston, which never received its intended, full release. A demo of "Proof" originally appeared as a B-side to "Morning Rain" in 2001. The album contains an extra song, hidden in the pregap, called "Deep Blue Sea," also released as a B-side on the "Life in a Day" single.

The singles "Life in a Day" and "3 Feet Tall" charted on the UK Singles Chart at #43 and #46 respectively.

On 25 January 2005, I Am Kloot became the first album by I Am Kloot released in the United States. In March 2005, the band gave their first concert tour in this country.

Track listing
All songs written by John Harold Arnold Bramwell.

Contributing musicians
Tony Gilfellon: additional guitar on "3 Feet Tall"
Bob Sastry: French horn on "The Same Deep Water as Me"
Isabelle Dunn: cello on "The Same Deep Water as Me"
Amanda Drummond: viola on "The Same Deep Water as Me"
Stella Page: violin on "The Same Deep Water as Me"
Prabjote Osahn: violin on "The Same Deep Water as Me"

Release history

Singles 
sources:

References 

2003 albums
I Am Kloot albums
Albums produced by Ian Broudie